Marist College is a secondary school for boys in Athlone, County Westmeath, Ireland.

The school was founded in 1884 by the Marist Brothers, a French Order, and the first principal was Brother Mungo. The original school was based in Glesson Street/Saint Mary's Square. The college had a seminary for Juniorate training between 1915 and 1936 located at Bailieborough Castle, County Cavan.

In 1973, the school moved to its current location on Retreat Road. The current principal is Michael Dermody.

F1 in Schools
F1 in Schools is the largest and most successful international, school-based
STEM competition. Annually, winners of the national final in each
participating country go on to the world finals, which are held in a host
country, and live streamed globally at the Grand Prix.
The competition requires students to form and properly finance an F1 team
to design and manufacture a miniature CO2-powered F1 car. Similarly to
real F1, teams must put together a pit booth, make a verbal presentation,
compile engineering and enterprise portfolios and answer judges' questions
on anything from the aero-dynamics of the car to the colour palette they
chose for branding. They then finally race against other teams.
 
Marist College is a school with a history in this competition, with 4 previous
teams reaching the world finals. Catalyst Racing is the schools current team. It consists of 4 members - Donal McDermott (Design Engineer),Owen McNamara (Team Manager), Conor Rowe (Scrutineer), Eoin Kane (Graphic Designer), David O'Shea (Sponsorship Manager) and Adam Kenny (Manufacturing Engineer).
Catalyst racing's operations are in the same building as Marist College

Notable past pupils

 Robbie Benson - footballer for St Patrick's Athletic
 Jack Carty - rugby union player
 Robbie Henshaw - rugby union player for Ireland
 Brian Lenihan - former Minister for Foreign Affairs and Tánaiste
 John McCormack - world famous tenor
 Hugh Milling - cricketer
 Feargal O'Rourke - Managing Partner of PwC Ireland, architect of the double Irish tax scheme
 Mark Rohan - Paralympic gold medal winner for Ireland
 Fergal Wilson - Retired GAA player for Tubberclaire GAA & Westmeath GAA

References

External links
 

1884 establishments in Ireland
Boys' schools in the Republic of Ireland
Buildings and structures in Athlone
Educational institutions established in 1884
Education in Athlone
Marist Brothers schools